The Kryvbas 2012–13 season is Kryvbas's 21st Ukrainian Premier League season, and their second season under manager Oleh Taran. During the season, Kryvbas will compete in the Ukrainian Premier League and Ukrainian Cup.

Squad

Squad is given according to the Ukrainian Premier League website and club's Official website as of September 1, 2012.

Out on loan

Competitions

2012-13 Ukrainian Premier League

Results summary

Results by round

Results

League table

2012–13 Ukrainian Cup Results

Squad statistics

Goal scorers

Appearances and goals

|-
|colspan="14"|Players who appeared for Volyn who left the club during the season:

|}

Disciplinary record

References

Kryvbas Kryvyi Rih
FC Kryvbas Kryvyi Rih seasons